Americium(IV) fluoride is the inorganic compound with the formula AmF4.  It is a tan solid.  In terms of its structure, solid AmF4 features 8-coordinate Am centers interconnected by doubly bridging fluoride ligands.

References

Americium compounds
Fluorides
Actinide halides